Thomas McCarthy  (1868 in Wales – ) was a Welsh international footballer. He was part of the Wales national football team, playing 1 match on 27 April 1889 against Ireland.

At club level, he played for Wrexham in the 1880s.

See also
 List of Wales international footballers (alphabetical)

References

1868 births
Welsh footballers
Wales international footballers
Wrexham A.F.C. players
Place of birth missing
Year of death missing
Association footballers not categorized by position